The men's normal hill individual ski jumping competition for the 1984 Winter Olympics was held at Igman Olympic Jumps. It occurred on 9 February.

Results

References

Ski jumping at the 1984 Winter Olympics